Platyclymeniidae is a family of ammonites belonging to the order Clymeniida.

These fast-moving nektonic carnivores lived in the Devonian period, Famennian stage (364.7 to 360.7 Ma).

Subfamilies and genera
Subfamilies and genera within the family Platyclymeniidae include:

Subfamily Nodosoclymeniinae Korn, 2002
Genus Czarnoclymenia Korn, 1999
Genus Nodosoclymenia Czarnocki, 1989
Genus Stenoclymenia Lange, 1929
Subfamily Platyclymeniinae Wedekind, 1914
Genus Fasciclymenia Korn and Price, 1987
Genus Platyclymenia Sepkoski, Jr., 2002
Genus Progonioclymenia Schindewolf, 1937
Genus Spinoclymenia Bogoslovsky, 1962
Genus Trigonoclymenia Schindewolf, 1934
Genus Varioclymenia Wedekind, 1908
Subfamily Pleuroclymeniinae Korn, 2002
Genus Borisiclymenia Korn, 2002
Genus Nanoclymenia Korn, 2002
Genus Pleuroclymenia Schindewolf, 1934
Genus Trochoclymenia Schindewolf, 1926

Distribution
Fossils of species within this genus have been found in the Devonian sediments of Australia, China, Morocco, Poland and United States.

References

Late Devonian first appearances
Late Devonian animals
Famennian extinctions
Ammonite families
Clymeniina